Chichester College is a college of further education in Chichester, West Sussex, England. It has a second campus at Brinsbury, near Pulborough. It is a member of the Collab Group which represents the largest colleges in England.

Chichester College has over 20,000 students, of whom over 5,000 are full-time (about 4,000 are between 16 and 18 years old; 1,000 are over 19 and several hundred are taking university level courses). Students can choose from a wide range of courses including:  A-levels (about 900 students); BTEC Diplomas at Level 3 (vocational A-level equivalents); and many vocational qualifications that prepare young people and adults for working life.

Brinsbury campus is part of a 570-acre estate and has its own commercial farm with dairy, beef, sheep, pig and arable enterprise all of which are used as the basis for much of the practical teaching.

The Chichester College group was rated 'Outstanding' in all areas of the Ofsted inspection framework in March 2020.

The Falkland Islands Government pays the college to educate Falkland Islanders for national diplomas and NVQs.

History

Chichester College, opened in 1964, as the major centre for a wide range of academic, commercial, scientific, technical, recreational and adult education courses in the south western part of West Sussex. The college is set in Westgate Fields within sight and to the south west of the Chichester Cathedral, half a mile from the Chichester Market Cross.

On 23 February 1972 David Bowie performed at the college as part of the Ziggy Stardust Tour.

Brinsbury campus is in West Sussex, three miles north of Pulborough. It was founded as an agricultural education centre for West Sussex and was a base for Land Girls during the Second World War. In 1966 it was officially designated the West Sussex School of Agriculture. It became Brinsbury College in 1998 and then merged with Chichester College in 2002.

Chichester College was awarded an Ofsted "Outstanding" in 2014. The financial situation of the college in 2014 was later described by the chief executive, Shelagh Legrave, as "really grim".

In 2017, merged with Crawley College (formerly Central Sussex College) creating the largest college group in Sussex. It merged again in 2019 with Worthing College.

In 2020, the group reopened Haywards Heath College.

The Chichester College group was rated 'Outstanding' in all areas of the Ofsted inspection framework in March 2020.

Facilities

Facilities at both campuses include laboratories, classrooms, libraries, computer suites, and specific facilities for vocational courses such as:

 iMedia rooms, art studios, a photography dark room and an exhibition space
 First Steps nurseries, a chain of children's nurseries owned by the college
Anglia Examinations, a subsidiary company that organises English exams for international students 
 Burlington English language room and other language labs 
 Gas training centre
 17 hairdressing and beauty therapy salons 
 Training kitchens and two training restaurants: Cafe 19 and Restaurant 64, which is fine dining. 
 The Riverside Theatre, recording studios, a recital hall, and many music rehearsal rooms
 Dance and drama studios
 Aircraft (the nose, cockpit, galley and front seating section) for cabin crew training
 All-weather sports pitch and a Sports Centre, which includes a climbing wall
 Stables, indoor riding school, two outdoor schools (Brinsbury Campus)
 Small animal unit (Brinsbury Campus)
 Dog grooming unit (Brinsbury Campus)
 Motor vehicle and motor cycle workshops
 Forge
 Construction workshops

References

External links

 Chichester College website

Further education colleges in Sussex
Further education colleges in the Collab Group
Education in Chichester
Education in the Falkland Islands
1964 establishments in the United Kingdom
Educational institutions established in 1964